This page describes the final meetings of the 2011 Individual Speedway Junior World Championship.

The 2011 FIM Speedway Under 21 World Championship Final meeting took place from July 24 to October 9, 2011. In a new format approved by the International Motorcycling Federation (FIM), there will be four final meetings with fourteen permanent riders and two wild cards and two track reserves. The permanent riders was determined in five Qualifying Round and two Semi-Finals.

Final One was scheduled to 16 July, like the 2011 Speedway World Cup Final. The 2009 and 2010 Junior World Champion, Darcy Ward of Australia, said about his potential absence in the Junior World Championship. After that, the FIM moved a Final One date one week later.

Results

Final One - Poole 
24 July 2011
 Poole, South West England
Poole Stadium (Length: 300 m)
Referee:  Frank Ziegler
Jury President:  Armando Castagna
References
Change:
Draw 8.  Vadim Tarasenko → Reserve 17 (Haines)
Draw 7.  Josh AutyWC → Reserve 18 (Worrall)

Final Two - Holsted, Denmark 
28 August 2011
 Holsted, Region of Southern Denmark
Holsted Speedway Center (Length: 300 m)
Referee:  J. Lawrence
Jury President:  A. Grodzki
References
Change:
Draw 18.  Jonas B. AndersenWC → Jensen

Top 8 riders in the overall classification

Final Three - Pardubice, Czech Republic 
1 October 2011
 Pardubice, Pardubice Region
Speedway track AMK Zlatá přilba Pardubice-Svítkov (Length: 391 m)
Referee:  Christian Froschauer
Jury President:  Christer Bergström
References

Top 8 riders in the overall classification

Final Four - Gniezno, Poland 
9 October 2011
 Gniezno, Greater Poland Voivodeship
Start Gniezno Stadium (Length: 348 m)
Referee:  Jesper Steentoft
Jury President:  Armando Castagna
Beat Time: 61.98 sec -  Darcy Ward in Heat 6 - new track record 
Attendance: 5,500 
References
Change:
Draw 15.  Dino Kovačić → Mikkel B. Jensen

Silver medal run-off 
Because after the last heat was a tie between second and third placed riders, a run-off was decided about silver and bronze medals.

See also 
 2011 Speedway Grand Prix
 2011 Team Speedway Junior World Championship

References